Clube Desportivo de Paços de Brandão commonly known as simply as Paços de Brandão is a Portuguese football club from Paços de Brandão, Santa Maria da Feira in the district of Aveiro. Founded in 1960, the club currently plays at the Estádio Dona Zulmira Sá e Silva which has a seating capacity of 2.500. The club is a member of the Aveiro Football Association. In its entire history, Paços de Brandão has won three major trophies: the AF Aveiro First Division in the 1971–72 season and two AF Aveiro Cups in the 1988–89 and 2004–05 seasons.

References

External links
 Club profile at ForaDeJogo
 Club profile at ZeroZero

Football clubs in Portugal
Sport in Santa Maria da Feira
Association football clubs established in 1960
1960 establishments in Portugal